Cheyenne Bouthoorn is a Dutch Paralympic athlete who competes in shot put and sprinting events at international elite competitions. She is a European multi-medalist in both of her events. She also competed at the 2020 Summer Paralympics in Tokyo, Japan.

References

Living people
Sportspeople from Almere
Paralympic athletes of the Netherlands
Dutch female sprinters
Dutch female shot putters
Medalists at the World Para Athletics European Championships
Athletes (track and field) at the 2020 Summer Paralympics
Date of birth missing (living people)
Year of birth missing (living people)
21st-century Dutch women